The 1993 All-SEC football team consists of American football players selected to the All-Southeastern Conference (SEC) chosen by various selectors for the 1993 college football season.

The Florida Gators won the conference, beat the Alabama Crimson Tide 28 to 13 in the SEC Championship game.  The Gators then defeated the West Virginia Mountaineers 41 to 7 in the Sugar Bowl.

Tennessee quarterback Heath Shuler was voted SEC Player of the Year.

Offensive selections

Quarterbacks 

 Heath Shuler, Tennessee (AP-1, Coaches-1)
Eric Zeier, Georgia (AP-2, Coaches-2)

Running backs 

 Errict Rhett, Florida (AP-1, Coaches-1)
James Bostic, Auburn (AP-1, Coaches-1)
Charlie Garner, Tennessee (AP-2, Coaches-2)
Moe Williams, Kentucky (AP-2)
Brandon Bennett, South Carolina (Coaches-2)

Wide receivers
David Palmer, Alabama (AP-1, Coaches-1)
Brice Hunter, Georgia (AP-1, Coaches-2)
Cory Fleming, Tennessee (AP-2, Coaches-1)
Jack Jackson, Florida (AP-2, Coaches-2)

Centers 
Tobie Sheils, Alabama (AP-1, Coaches-1)
Kevin Mawae, LSU (AP-2, Coaches-2)

Guards 
Jeff Smith, Tennessee (AP-1, Coaches-1)
Jim Watson, Florida (AP-1)
Ryan Bell, Vanderbilt (AP-2, Coaches-2)
Anthony Redmon, Auburn (AP-2, Coaches-2)

Tackles
Wayne Grady, Auburn (AP-1, Coaches-1)
Reggie Green, Florida (AP-1, Coaches-1)
Bernard Williams, Georgia (AP-2, Coaches-1)
Jason Odom, Florida (AP-2, Coaches-2)
Issac Davis, Arkansas (Coaches-2)

Tight ends 
 Shannon Mitchell, Georgia (AP-1, Coaches-1)
Kirk Botkin, Arkansas (AP-2)
Harold Bishop, LSU (Coaches-2)

Defensive selections

Ends
Henry Ford, Arkansas (AP-1, Coaches-1)
Jeremy Nunley, Alabama (AP-1, Coaches-1)
James Wilson, Tennessee (AP-2, Coaches-2)
Alan Young, Vanderbilt (AP-2, Coaches-2)

Tackles 
William Gaines, Florida (AP-1, Coaches-1)
Arleye Gibson, Miss. St. (AP-1)
James Gregory, Alabama (AP-2)
Tim Bowens, Ole Miss (AP-2)
Stacy Evans, South Carolina (Coaches-2)

Linebackers 
Dewayne Dotson, Ole Miss (AP-1, Coaches-1)
Marty Moore, Kentucky (AP-1, Coaches-1)
Cassius Ware, Ole Miss (AP-1, Coaches-2)
Mitch Davis, Georgia (AP-1, Coaches-2)
Ernest Dixon, South Carolina (AP-2, Coaches-1)
Lemanski Hall, Alabama (AP-2, Coaches-1)
Randall Godfrey, Georgia (Coaches-1)
Abdul Jackson, Ole Miss (AP-2, Coaches-2)
Ben Talley, Tennessee (AP-2)
Juan Long, Miss. St. (Coaches-2)

Cornerbacks 
Antonio Langham, Alabama (AP-1, Coaches-1)
Alundis Brice, Ole Miss (AP-1, Coaches-2)
Calvin Jackson, Auburn (AP-1, Coaches-2)
Johnny Dixon, Ole Miss (AP-2, Coaches-1)
Orlando Watters, Arkansas (Coaches-1)
Anthony Marshall, LSU (AP-2)

Safeties 
Marcus Jenkins, Kentucky (AP-2, Coaches-1)
Jason Parker, Tennessee (AP-2, Coaches-2)
Chris Shelling, Auburn (Coaches-2)
Walter Davis, Miss. St. (Coaches-2)

Special teams

Kicker 
John Becksvoort, Tennessee (AP-1, Coaches-2)
Michael Proctor, Alabama (AP-2, Coaches-1)

Punter 

 Terry Daniel, Auburn (AP-1, Coaches-1)
Shayne Edge, Florida (AP-2, Coaches-2)

Key
AP = Associated Press

Coaches = selected by the SEC coaches The 1993 coaches All-SEC team was the first to have a second team selection.

Bold = Consensus first-team selection by both Coaches and AP

See also
1993 College Football All-America Team

References

All-SEC
All-SEC football teams